The Wochenblatt.pl (Weekly)—until January 2011 "Schlesisches Wochenblatt" (Silesian Weekly)—is a German newspaper published weekly in Opole, Poland, with a circulation of 6,500.

External links
 

Weekly newspapers published in Poland
Mass media in Opole